Trouble Man is a 1972 American blaxploitation crime thriller film directed by Ivan Dixon and produced and released by 20th Century Fox. The film stars Robert Hooks as "Mr. T.", a hard-edged private detective who tends to take justice into his own hands. It is still of note today for its soundtrack, written, produced and performed by Marvin Gaye.

Plot summary 
An inner-city point man is on the run from both the cops and the crooks in this streetwise drama. T (Robert Hooks) is a combination pool shark, private detective, and all-purpose ghetto fixer who operates out of a billiards parlor in South Central Los Angeles. T has done well for himself—he buys a fancy new car every year, wears expensive suits, and lives in an upscale apartment.  But, he also looks out for folks in South Central, has lukewarm connections with both the police and gangsters, and generally knows how to tell the good guys from the bad guys on either side of the law. T is approached by Chalky (Paul Winfield) and his partner, Pete (Ralph Waite), who run floating dice games in the neighborhood. Chalky tells T they've been ripped off several times by a group of four robbers,  and they want to hire him to find out who the masked stick-up men are.

T takes it as a routine assignment and is willing to do the job for the right price.  What he does not know is that Chalky and Pete are trying to take down rival crime kingpin Big (Julius Harris). They frame T for the killing of one of Big's underlings, who is shot by Chalky moments after a dice game is robbed by four men (T was present at the hold-up). An anonymous informant fingers T for the killing and makes him the target for Big and for LAPD captain Joe Marx (William Smithers), who dislikes T on principle. That sets off a series of cunning twists and confrontations that T is determined to survive, which becomed complicated when Big is shot and killed in front of T.

Cast 
 Robert Hooks as Mr. T
 Paul Winfield as "Chalky" Price
 Ralph Waite as Pete Cockrell
 William Smithers as Captain Joe Marx 
 Paula Kelly as Cleo
 Julius Harris as "Big"
 Bill Henderson as Jimmy
 Wayne Storm as Frank
 Akili Jones as Billy Chi
 Vince Howard as Preston
 Stack Pierce as Collie
 Nathaniel Taylor as Leroy
 Lawrence Cook as Buddy 
 Virginia Capers as Macy
 Rick Ferrell as Pindar
 James "Texas Blood" Brown as Wesley
 Gordon Jump as Salter 
 Jean Bell as Leona

Production
The film was written and executive produced by John D. F. Black, who had co-written Shaft (1971). Black, who had written for various television shows such as Johnny Staccato, hoped to cash in on the trend set by that film. This was the directorial debut of Ivan Dixon, who had become a director in 1970 after trying to hone his craft by asking questions when acting on Hogan's Heroes. 

Black and his wife were interviewed about the making of the film in 2019 for the podcast The Projection Booth.

Critical reception
The film was featured in the 1978 Harry Medved book, The Fifty Worst Films of All Time. In contrast, Complex included Trouble Man on its 2009 list of "The 50 Best Blaxploitation Movies of All Time".

New York Times reviewer Vincent Canby described it as "a horrible movie, but worth thinking about."

Jimi Izrael of NPR called Trouble Man "a strong film" but one that "never had an entry point for mainstream audiences to grasp."

See also
 List of American films of 1972
 List of blaxploitation films

References

External links
 
 Trouble Man film trailer

1972 films
1970s crime thriller films
20th Century Fox films
American crime thriller films
Blaxploitation films
1972 directorial debut films
1970s English-language films
1970s American films